Kita "Petre" Chkhenkeli (Tschenkéli in western literature) (8 November 1895 – 22 October 1963) was a Georgian linguist and lexicographer based in Germany and Switzerland. He is best known for his Georgisch-Deutsches Wörterbuch, which is "widely regarded as the most comprehensive Georgian dictionary in any western language."

Biography
Tschenkéli was born in Kutaisi, the second largest city of Georgia, then part of the Russian Empire. He was a younger brother of the prominent Social-Democratic politician Akaki Chkhenkeli. He studied law and world literature at the University of Moscow from 1913 to 1917. Returning to Georgia after the Russian Revolution of 1917, Tschenkéli obtained, in 1920, a state bursary to continue his education in Germany, where he attended the universities of Halle and Hamburg. The fall of the Georgian republic to the Bolshevik invasion in 1921 precluded his return to the homeland. He lectured at the University of Hamburg and, after the end of World War II, moved to Zürich, where he taught the Georgian and Russian languages. In 1961, he obtained the honorary degree of doctorate from the University of Zürich. Tschenkéli died in Zurich of pneumonia. His grave has been lost.

Works
Tschenkéli's principal contribution to the Georgian studies consists of a grammar (1958), chrestomathy (1958), and a voluminous Georgian-German dictionary, which was published posthumously from 1965 to 1974. Together with Ruth Neukomm, he also contributed to and edited the German translations of the medieval Georgian epics Visramiani (Wisramiani: oder die Geschichte der Liebe von Wis und Ramin, 1957) and The Knight in the Panther's Skin (Der Mann im Pantherfell, 1974).

References

1895 births
1963 deaths
People from Kutaisi
People from Kutais Governorate
Linguists from Georgia (country)
Lexicographers from Georgia (country)
Kartvelian studies scholars
Soviet emigrants to Germany
Moscow State University alumni
University of Halle alumni
University of Hamburg alumni
Academic staff of the University of Hamburg
Academic staff of the University of Zurich
Deaths from pneumonia in Switzerland
20th-century linguists
20th-century lexicographers